Palerang is a locality in Queanbeyan-Palerang Regional Council, New South Wales, Australia. The town lies 55 km east of Canberra on the Palerang range. It includes part of the Tallaganda National Park and State Conservation Area.

References

Localities in New South Wales
Queanbeyan–Palerang Regional Council